The Zhongxing C3 Urban Ark is a subcompact CUV designed and developed by Hebei Zhongxing Automobile.

Overview

The Zhongxing C3 Urban Ark was launched by Zhongxing Automobile on December 21, 2013, as their first entry into the crossover market.

Prices of the Zhongxing C3 Urban Ark starts at 57,800 yuan and ends at 58,800 yuan.

Powertrain
The only engine choice of the C3 Urban Ark is a Mitsubishi-sourced 1.5 liter gasoline engine producing 104 hp and 141 nm of torque, mated to a 5-speed manual gearbox and powering front wheels.

2014 facelift
A more premium variant of the Zhongxing C3 Urban Ark was launched on the 2014 Guangzhou Auto Show as a concept called the Zhongxing GX3, featuring a restyled front and rear end.

Zhongxing Cross Van
The C3 Urban Ark received a facelift and rename in 2021 to Zhongxing Cross Van, featuring a redesigned front end.

References

External links
Zhongxing Auto official site

2010s cars
Cars introduced in 2013
Cars of China
Crossover sport utility vehicles
Front-wheel-drive vehicles
Mini sport utility vehicles